Golden Ballet (foaled  January 24, 1998) is an American Thoroughbred racehorse and the winner of the 2001 Santa Anita Oaks.

Career

Golden Ballet's first race was on March 23, 2000, where she came in third at Santa Anita.

She got her first win in her fourth race, when she won the Nursery Stakes at Hollywood Park Racetrack on May 20, 2000. This race began a five race win streak for Golden Ballet.

Golden Ballet's next win was at the June 18, 2000, Cinderella Stakes. She then picked up her first graded win by capturing the January 20th, 2001, Santa Ynez Stakes.

She then captured a pair of  grade 1 wins, by winning the 2001 Las Virgenes Stakes and the 2001 Santa Anita Oaks. Her winstreak snapped when she ran second in the April 7, 2001, Ashland Stakes.

Golden Ballet's last race was on May 19, 2001 when she captured the Railbird Stakes. She suffered a tendon injury on June 5th, 2001 and was retired.

Pedigree

References

1998 racehorse births
American racehorses
American Grade 1 Stakes winners
Racehorses trained in the United States
Thoroughbred family 10-d